Demiivska Square is one of the squares of Kyiv, Ukraine.

Located in the historical area Demiivka (southern Kyiv), emerged in the XIXth century and had name Market Square (Базарна), but commonly known as Demiivska after the name of former city suburb. 

After construction of Central Bus Station has received name Bus Station Square (Автовокзальна).

From 1969 the square had name Moscow Square (Московська).

Current name is from 2016.

The square is an intersection of several streets and avenues Holosiivskyi and Lobanoskoho.

References

Sources 
 Demiivska Square on wek.kiev.ua (in Ukrainian)
 Вулиці Києва. Довідник / упоряд. А. М. Сигалов та ін. — К. : Реклама, 1975. — С. 11. (in Ukrainian)

Holosiivskyi District
Squares in Kyiv